Morgan Jarvis (born January 9, 1983) is a Canadian rower. He participated in the 2012 Summer Olympics in London where he competed in the Men's lightweight double sculls event together with his teammate Douglas Vandor. They qualified for the C finals, where they reached a second place, finishing in 14th place overall.

References

1983 births
Canadian male rowers
Living people
Olympic rowers of Canada
Rowers at the 2012 Summer Olympics
Rowers from Winnipeg